Lee Calland (born September 14, 1941) is a former football player, a defensive back for ten seasons in the National Football League (NFL).  Graduating from the University of Louisville he was the first rookie ever to start at the position of cornerback in the NFL when he joined the Minnesota Vikings in 1963.  In 1963 made all-rookie team.  In 1968, his last of three years with the Atlanta Falcons, he helped seal victory over the New York Giants with an interception off Fran Tarkenton late in the 4th quarter, one of only two victories for the Falcons all season, losing 12, in their 3rd year of existence.

Personal life
Calland currently resides in Atlanta, Georgia.

1941 births
Living people
Players of American football from Louisville, Kentucky
American football cornerbacks
Louisville Cardinals football players
Minnesota Vikings players
Atlanta Falcons players
Chicago Bears players
Pittsburgh Steelers players